The Big Hardee is a hamburger sandwich offered by Hardee's. The original Big Hardee was introduced in 1995 and was designed to compete against McDonald's Big Mac or Burger King's Whopper. It debuted in a commercial with the Big Mac sandwich. It had a jingle that goes, "More meat, more cheese, less money. La la la la la."

History and description
The Big Hardee was re-released in September, 2009. The sandwich features three 9:1 (9 patties = 1 pound) beef patties, two slices of American cheese, shredded lettuce and Big Twin Sauce on a 4-inch seeded bun. The sandwich averages 920 calories, 58g of fat and 1380 mg of sodium.

Additionally, Hardee's sister chain, Carl's Jr. also introduced its version of the Big Hardee, The Big Carl.

The Big Hardee was reintroduced in response to McDonald's inclusion of Angus beef into its own sandwich lineup.

Notes

External links
Hardee's unsaddles Roy's, hits back-to-basics trail 
Hardee's taps El Pollo's Perry as chief officer
 Official Hardee's Menu

CKE Restaurants
Products introduced in 1995
Fast food hamburgers